Murienua is a Cook Islands electoral division returning one member to the Cook Islands Parliament.

The electorate was created in 1981, when the Constitution Amendment (No. 9) Act 1980–1981 adjusted electorate boundaries and split the electorate of Puaikura into two. In 1991 the electorate was split in half by the Constitution Amendment (No. 14) Act 1991 to form the electorate of Akaoa. It currently consists of the tapere of Kavera, Aroa, and Rutaki on the island of Rarotonga.

Members of Parliament

References

Rarotonga
Cook Islands electorates